The toilet circuit is the network of small music venues in the United Kingdom which rising indie, rock and metal bands often visit to gain support and promote themselves. The name may refer to the size and often the cleanliness of the venue, or a lack of dressing rooms leading to the band being required to change in the toilets.

Most of Britain's large towns and cities are home to at least one toilet circuit venue, although a regular toilet circuit tour is only around 20 dates long at the most, meaning not all of the said venues are present in all toilet-circuit tours. Some of the largest cities, however, such as London, Manchester, Glasgow and Nottingham, appear on almost every tour, and these cities accordingly have many venues which could be described as "toilet venues". The circuit is mentioned in the Muse song "Muscle Museum" – "I have played in every toilet." Frank Turner also references it in the song "I Still Believe", as "toilet circuit touring stops".

The 21st century saw the closure of several well-known toilet circuit venues, with many more under threat. In London, for example, 40% of the city's live music venues were said to have closed in the decade to 2016. This trend increased after the passing of the Live Music Act 2012, which allowed any venue with under 200 capacity to hold live music without a licence, and has been cited as a major factor in the decline of paid-entry live music events.

Rock Sound TV has used the "Toilet Circuit" moniker to film a series of acoustic performances filmed in the grimiest locations at music venues across the UK, featuring bands such as The Blackout, Thrice, Futures, Lights, Vessels and Deaf Havana.

Notable toilet circuit venues
London

 The Barfly, Camden Town, London (opened 1996)
 Dublin Castle, Camden, London
 The Bull and Gate, London

Scotland

 King Tut's Wah Wah Hut, Glasgow (opened 1990)

Wales

 TJ's, Newport (reopened 2018 as El Siecco's)
 Clwb Ifor Bach, Cardiff

North East

 The New Adelphi Club, Hull (opened 1984)

North West

 The Roadhouse, Manchester (closed 2015)
 The Zanzibar, Liverpool

Oxfordshire

 Jericho Tavern, Oxford
 The Zodiac, Oxford (became O2 Academy Oxford in 2007)

South West

 Joiners Arms, Southampton
 The Wedgewood Rooms, Portsmouth
 The Fleece, Bristol

South East

 Buzz Club, Aldershot (1985-1993)
 The Forum, Tunbridge Wells (opened 1993)
 The Square, Harlow (closed 2016)

Yorkshire

 The Boardwalk, Sheffield (opened 1960s, closed 2010)
 The Leadmill, Sheffield (opened 1980)
 The Cockpit, Leeds (opened 1994, closed 2014)
 The Duchess of York, Leeds
 Fibbers, York

Midlands

 Rock City, Nottingham (opened 1980)
 The Charlotte, Leicester (closed 2010)
 The Sugarmill, Stoke-on-Trent (opened 1995)
 Esquires, Bedford (opened 1990) 
 The Victoria Inn, Derby

East Anglia

 The Waterfront, Norwich

References